Stromboli is an island in the Tyrrhenian Sea, off the north coast of Sicily, containing Mount Stromboli, one of the four active volcanoes in Italy. It is one of the eight Aeolian Islands, a volcanic arc north of Sicily. Strabo writes that people believed that this is where Aeolus lived.

Its population was about 500 . The volcano has erupted many times and is constantly active with minor eruptions, often visible from many points on the island and from the surrounding sea, giving rise to the island's nickname "Lighthouse of the Mediterranean".

Etymology

Height and shape
Stromboli is an island in the Tyrrhenian Sea, off the north coast of Sicily, containing Mount Stromboli, one of the three active volcanoes in Italy. It is one of the seven Aeolian Islands, a volcanic arc north of Sicily; these islands are also known as the Lipari Islands.

Stromboli stands 926 m (3,038 ft) above sea level,
and over 2,700 m (8,860 ft) on average above the sea floor.

There are three active craters at the peak. A significant geological feature of the volcano is the Sciara del Fuoco ("stream of fire"), a big horseshoe-shaped depression created in the last 13,000 years by several collapses on the northwestern side of the cone.

Volcano

Mount Stromboli has been in almost continuous eruption for the past 2,000–5,000 years;  its last serious one occurred in 1921. A pattern of eruption is maintained in which explosions occur at the summit craters, with mild to moderate eruptions of incandescent volcanic bombs, a type of tephra, at intervals ranging from minutes to hours. This pattern of Strombolian eruption, as it is known, is also observed at other volcanoes worldwide.

Eruptions from the summit craters typically result in a few short, mild, but energetic bursts, ranging up to a few hundred meters in height, containing ash, incandescent lava fragments and stone blocks. Stromboli's activity is almost exclusively explosive, but lava flows do occur at times when volcanic activity is high: an effusive eruption occurred in 2002, the first in 17 years, and again in 2003, 2007, and 2013–14. Volcanic gas emissions from this volcano are measured by a multi-component gas analyzer system, which detects pre-eruptive degassing of rising magma, improving prediction of volcanic activity.

On 3 July 2019, two major explosive events occurred at around 16:46 local time, alongside 20 additional minor explosive events identified by Italy's National Institute of Geophysics and Volcanology. A hiker near the volcano's summit died after being struck by flying debris when the eruption began. Additionally, 6 people suffered minor injuries due to the eruption.

On 28 August 2019, at 10:16 local time, an explosive eruption sent a pyroclastic flow down the volcano's northern flank and into the sea, where it continued for several hundred meters before collapsing.

Settlements

The two villages San Bartolo and San Vincenzo lie in the northeast while the smaller village Ginostra lies in the southwest.

In the early 1900s a few thousand people inhabited the island, but after several waves of emigration the population has numbered a few hundred since the mid-1950s. The population on the island was about 500 .

In addition to Italian, a derivative of the Sicilian dialect that is called Aeolian is generally spoken on this and the other Aeolian islands.

In popular culture
 In Journey to the Center of the Earth (1864) by Jules Verne, the conclusion of the novel is set on Stromboli.
 Author J. R. R. Tolkien identified his fictional volcano Mount Doom in Mordor with the volcano of Stromboli, according to scholar Clyde S. Kilby.
 Stromboli (1950), also known as: Stromboli, Land of God, is an Italian-American film set on Stromboli, directed by Roberto Rossellini and starring Ingrid Bergman.
Rising Appalachia's 2015 song "Stromboli" was written on and titled after the island. The studio version appears on Wider Circles (2015) and a live version appears on Alive.

See also
 List of islands of Italy

References

External links

 
 Information about Stromboli and on its seismic monitoring network (italian)
 BBC documentary Island of Fire
 Scuola In Mezzo Al Mare School in the Middle of the Sea documentary (2019)

Islands of Italy
Islands of Sicily
Aeolian Islands
Stromboli
Volcanic islands